The title of Senior Counsel or State Counsel (post-nominal letters: SC) is given to a senior lawyer in some countries that were formerly part of the British Empire. "Senior Counsel" is used in current or former Commonwealth countries or jurisdictions that have chosen to change the title "King's Counsel" to a name without monarchical connotations, usually related to the British monarch that is no longer head of state, such that reference to the King is no longer appropriate. Examples of jurisdictions which have made the change because of the latter reason include Mauritius, Zambia, India, Hong Kong, Ireland, South Africa, Kenya, Malawi, Singapore, Guyana and Trinidad and Tobago. Jurisdictions which have retained the monarch as head of state, but have nonetheless opted for the new title include some states and territories of Australia, as well as Belize.

Just as a junior counsel is "called to the [Outer] Bar", a Senior Counsel is, in some jurisdictions, said to be "called to the Inner Bar". Senior Counsel may informally style themselves as silks, like their British counterparts. This is the case in Ireland, Australia, Hong Kong and South Africa.

Dress 

In Hong Kong, every Senior Counsel must wear the black robe and silk gown together with a wig when appearing in open court. While in Ireland, Senior Counsel wear a silk gown which differs from that of a Junior Counsel. The wig is optional in Ireland.

Australia 

The rank of Senior Counsel has also been introduced in most states and territories of Australia, even though the King remains head of state. Between 1993 and 2008 all Australian jurisdictions except the Northern Territory replaced the title of Queen's Counsel with that of Senior Counsel. However, in 2013 Queensland restored the rank of Queen's Counsel and there was talk of other Australian states following suit. On 3 February 2014, the Victorian Attorney-General announced that the rank of Queen's Counsel would shortly be reinstated in the State of Victoria, with existing and future Senior Counsel having the option to apply to be issued with letters patent appointing them as Queen's Counsel; some 89% of barristers entitled to be called Senior Counsel were reported to have applied for letters patent to become Queen's Counsel.
On 18 February 2019, the South Australian Government restored the rank of Queen's Counsel.

The formal difference appears to be that QCs receive a warrant signed by the relevant state governor, who is the formal representative of the sovereign, whereas SCs receive a certificate issued by the relevant bar association or bureaucracy such as by the judicature of the state supreme court as the case may be.

Barbados 

The title of Senior Counsel has replaced that of Queen's Counsel in Barbados, which became a republic on 30 November 2021.

Belize 

Senior Counsel are appointed in Belize, even though King Charles III is King of Belize.

Hong Kong 

"Senior Counsel" replaced QC in the law of Hong Kong after the transfer of the sovereignty of Hong Kong from the United Kingdom to China in 1997. King's Counsel who had been appointed KC in HK or British King's Counsel who had been admitted to practice in Hong Kong generally prior to the handover became senior counsel automatically.

King's Counsel from England or other senior counsel from other jurisdictions are not accorded any precedence if they are admitted generally in Hong Kong. However, visiting King's Counsel from another jurisdiction who have been admitted for a specific case are entitled to use the title, and to be accorded the status, of Senior Counsel for the purposes of those proceedings.

India 

A member of the bar could be designated as a Senior Advocate upon a selection process that employs various criteria for designation. The said designation happens by the Supreme Court directly, or through the concerned state High Court. In August 2018 the Supreme Court has issued guidelines to regulate conferment of designation of Senior Advocate. Senior advocates' gowns have a flap at the back to distinguish them from junior counsels.

Ireland 

The Irish Free State came into existence in December 1922 as a dominion within the British Commonwealth of Nations. John O'Byrne was the sole King's Counsel (KC) appointed after independence, in June 1924 when he was Attorney General of Ireland. Shortly after the Courts of Justice Act 1924 came into effect, Chief Justice Hugh Kennedy, in conjunction with the Bar Council of Ireland, revived the issue of patents of precedence, which had been used in the 18th and 19th century as an alternative to a patent as KC, but had fallen into disuse from 1883 as the strictures formerly associated with the rank of KC were abolished. The Irish Free State patent wording was based on that issued to Daniel O'Connell; the recipient would be styled "Senior Counsel" (SC). According to the view held at the time, the "privilege of patent" was part of the royal prerogative within the Free State. The early patents were issued under the Free State's [internal] Great Seal by the Governor-General as the King's representative, on the advice of the Executive Council (government). On 14 July 1924 the Chief Justice called the first recipients to the "within the bar" and bestowed their patents.  The form of the 1924 patent omitted the appointment as "one of our counsel learned in the law" from the KC patent, but retained its grant of "precedence and preaudience" to rank next after the previously appointed KC or SC. The Constitution (Amendment No. 27) Act 1936 abolished the office of Governor-General and the Executive Powers (Consequential Provisions) Act 1937 was held to have transferred the royal prerogative to the Executive Council (government). Although the 1937 Constitution of Ireland created the office of President of Ireland, it was still the Taoiseach as head of government who signed patents of precedence under the Executive Powers (Consequential Provisions) Act 1937.

The title "K.C." continued to be used by many Senior Counsel, both those created before July 1924 and those after. In 1949, shortly before the coming into force of the Republic of Ireland Act 1948, which created the Republic of Ireland and broke the final link with the British Crown, Frank Aiken asked John A. Costello during Taoiseach's questions "whether, in view of the fact that certain members of the Inner Bar who received their patents as senior counsel continue to describe themselves as king's counsel, he will introduce a bill entitled an act to declare that the description of a senior counsel shall be senior counsel"; Costello said he had "no intention of wasting public time and money" on the idea. As late as the 1960s, R.G.L. Leonard (made KC before 1922) was described in the official Irish law reports as "Queen's Counsel", reflecting the British change from King to Queen in 1952.

The Legal Services Regulation Act 2015 provides for the Legal Services Regulatory Authority (LSRA) to establish an Advisory Committee on the grant of Patents of Precedence. The committee comprises the Chief Justice, the Presidents of the Court of Appeal and High Court, the Attorney General, heads of the Bar Council and Law Society of Ireland, and a lay member appointed by the Minister for Justice. The relevant part of the 2015 act was commenced in 2019. It allows the bestowal of the title "Senior Counsel" on solicitors. The LSRA advisory committee replaces an earlier advisory committee which had no statutory basis, and no solicitor or lay member. The 2015 act also specifies the criteria for both solicitors and barristers:
(a) has, in his or her practice as a legal practitioner, displayed—
(i) a degree of competence and a degree of probity appropriate to and consistent with the grant to him or her of a Patent,
(ii) professional independence, and
(iii) one or more of the following:
(I) a proven capacity for excellence in the practice of advocacy;
(II) a proven capacity for excellence in the practice of specialist litigation; or
(III) specialist knowledge of an area of law;
(b) is suitable on grounds of character and temperament;
(c) is in possession of a tax clearance certificate that is in force;
(d) is otherwise suitable to be granted a Patent.

It is still the government which grants the patent of privilege and the Chief Justice of Ireland who calls patentees to the Inner Bar. Of about 2,300 barristers registered with the Bar Council of Ireland, about 325 are SCs. On 1 September 2020 the cabinet approved the first batch of 37 recommendations of the LSRA advisory committee. These were appointed senior counsel the following day, including the first 17 (out of 60 applicant) solicitors.

In Northern Ireland, the designation King's Counsel (KC) or Queen's Counsel (QC) has continued since 1921, as in the rest of the United Kingdom.

New Zealand 
The title "Senior Counsel" was briefly established in New Zealand from 2007 until 2009. It was abolished by the following government in favour of restoring the title of Queen's Counsel on the basis of the respect felt accorded to those appointed Queen's Counsel. Those appointed as Senior Counsel were given the option of becoming Queen's Counsel or remaining as Senior Counsel.

Singapore 
"Senior Counsel" is used in the law of Singapore. There is no independent bar in Singapore and senior counsel practice as members of law firms. Prior to independence select members were given the title of King's Counsel or Queen's Counsel.

South Africa 

"Senior Counsel" (in Afrikaans Senior Advokaat) replaced QC in South Africa after the Union became a republic on 31 May 1961, with appointments being made by the state president until 1994, when the office was succeeded by that of president. A judge in the High Court in the province of Gauteng ruled that under the 1993 constitution, the president did not have the power to grant Senior Counsel status. This judgment has been overturned by the Supreme Court of Appeal and also the Constitutional Court. See Advocate#South Africa.

United Kingdom 

In the United Kingdom, the position of senior counsel (lowercase) is used to denote an experienced solicitor (who need not be an advocate), who is not on the path to partnership. This position is therefore analogous to the American title of counsel, and is not directly comparable to the position of King's Counsel/Senior Counsel, which is held by barristers.

Similar titles 

Other jurisdictions have adopted similar titles:

 Senior Advocate under the law of Bangladesh, law of Pakistan, and that of Nigeria (see Senior Advocate of Nigeria).
President's Counsel in Sri Lanka. In contrast, state counsels are the public prosecutors in the legal system of Sri Lanka.

References

Footnotes

Citations

 
Common law